

Events
February – Andrea Bocelli stars in two performances of Gounod's Roméo et Juliette at the Teatro Carlo Felice in Genoa.  He cancels a third after suffering voice strain.
April 10 – A terminally-ill Robin Gibb is unable to attend the première of his new work, the Titanic Requiem, at the Central Hall, Westminster, London.
April 26 – Kurt Masur, conducting the Orchestre National de France in Paris, falls from the podium and is rushed to hospital, where he is found to have broken his shoulder.
May 7 – Sir Colin Davis, conducting the Sachsische Staatskapelle at the Semper Oper in Dresden, stumbles and almost falls from the podium. 
July 25 – The Classic Brits award ceremony for 2012, originally due to take place on this date, is postponed to October 2.
August 22 – Nearly five years after the composer's death, on what would have been his 84th birthday, Karlheinz Stockhausen's opera Mittwoch aus Licht is performed in its entirety for the first time, by the UK's Birmingham Opera Company, as part of the 2012 Cultural Olympiad.
September 9 – A day after her performance at the Last Night of The Proms, Nicola Benedetti's album, The Silver Violin, becomes the highest new entry by a solo instrumentalist in the UK Official Album Chart since 1991.
September 15 – The Jozsef Szigeti International Violina and Viola Competition, held in Budapest, is jointly won by Aleksandra Kuls and Wang Xiao.

New works
According to the League of American Orchestras, North American orchestras premiered 165 new works in the 2012–13 season. 
 
Peter Maxwell Davies – Symphony No. 9
Francesco Filidei – Ballata No. 2
Philip Glass – Symphony No. 10
Howard Goodall – Every Purpose Under the Heaven (The King James Bible Oratorio)
Karl Jenkins – The Peacemakers
Wojciech Kilar – Sonnets to Laura for baritone and piano (song cycle)
Philip Ledger – This Holy Child (cantata)
David T. Little and Royce Vavrek – Am I Born
Daan Manneke – Nachtmuziek, for cello and piano
Matthew Mehlan and Royce Vavrek – Canvas
Nico Muhly – Drones
Max Richter – Recomposed by Max Richter: The Four Seasons
Christopher Rouse – Heimdall's Trumpet
Caroline Shaw – Partita for 8 Voices
Aleksandr Shymko
Concerto for violin and symphony orchestra
Concerto for violin, viola and symphony orchestra
Steven Stucky – Symphony

Opera premieres

Missy Mazzoli and Royce Vavrek – Song From the Uproar – The Lives and Deaths of Isabelle Eberhardt

Films
Love in Portofino, with Andrea Bocelli

Albums
Tony Banks – Six Pieces for Orchestra
Andrea Bocelli – Opera
eighth blackbird – Meanwhile
Ludovico Einaudi – Divenire
Jackie Evancho – Songs from the Silver Screen
Renée Fleming – Poèmes
Lesley Garrett – A North Country Lass
Robin Gibb & Robin-John Gibb – Titanic Requiem
Oregon Symphony – This England
Fazıl Say – Istanbul Symphony
Noah Stewart – Noah
Rolando Villazón – Verdi

Deaths
January 9 – Ruth Fernández, Puerto Rican contralto and politician, 92
January 18 – Anthony Gonsalves, Indian violinist and composer, 84
January 20 – Ruthilde Boesch, 94, Austrian soprano
January 22 – Rita Gorr, 85, Belgian mezzo-soprano
January 24 – Patricia Neway, US operatic soprano and musical theatre actress, 92 
January 29 – Camilla Williams, 92, American soprano
February 1 – Andrij Dobriansky, 81, Ukrainian American bass-baritone
February 8 – Giangiacomo Guelfi, 87, Italian baritone
February 14 – Charles Anthony, 82, American tenor
February 16 – Ethel Stark, Canadian violinist and conductor, 101
February 18 – Elizabeth Connell, South African operatic soprano, 65
February 24 – István Anhalt, Hungarian-Canadian composer, 92
April 8 – George Wilberforce Kakoma, Ugandan composer, 89
April 10 – Lili Chookasian, 90, American contralto
April 12 – Stefánia Moldován, 80, Hungarian soprano
April 16 – Alan Hacker, English clarinettist, 73
April 16 – Sári Barabás, 98, Hungarian soprano
April 20 – Leandra Overmann, 55, Serbian mezzo-soprano/contralto
April 30 – Finn Benestad, Norwegian musicologist, 82
May 2 – Zvi Zeitlin, Russian violinist and music teacher, 90
May 3 – Felix Werder, Australian composer, 90
May 16 – Maria Bieșu, 76, Moldovan soprano
May 18 – Dietrich Fischer-Dieskau, German lyric baritone and conductor, 86
May 29 – Mark Minkov, Russian composer, 67
June 4 – Eduard Khil, Russian baritone, 77
June 13 – Jože Humer, Slovenian composer and choirmaster, 76
June 14 
Karl-Heinz Kämmerling, German classical pianist and teacher, 82
Hassan Kassai, Iranian Ney player, 83
June 23 – Franz Crass, German operatic bass, 84
June 24 – Jean Cox, US operatic tenor, 90
June 28 – Éric Gaudibert, Swiss composer, 75 
July 1 – Evelyn Lear, 86, American soprano
July 10 – Viktor Suslin, Russian composer, 70
July 16 
Ed Lincoln, Brazilian composer and musician, 80  
Jon Lord, English composer, 71
July 17 – İlhan Mimaroğlu, Turkish-born American composer and record producer, 86
July 22 – Nan Merriman, 92, American mezzo-soprano
August 2 
Marguerite Piazza, American singer, 90
Mihaela Ursuleasa, Romanian pianist, 33 (cerebral hemorrhage; (body discovered on this date)
August 6 – Ruggiero Ricci, American violinist, 94
August 7 – Sabahattin Kalender, Turkish composer, 93
August 7 – , 73, German bass
August 11 – Carlo Curley, American classical organist, 59
August 16 – Bystrík Režucha, Slovak conductor, 77
August 23 – Marlise Wendels, 89, German soprano
September 1 – Amanda Thane, 59, Australian soprano
September 2 – Emmanuel Nunes, Portuguese composer, 71
September 4 – Ian Parrott, British composer and academic, 96
September 12 – William Schatzkamer, American pianist and conductor, 96
September 13 – William Duckworth, US composer, 69 
September 15 
Olga Ferri, Argentine ballet dancer, 83
George Hurst, British conductor, 86
September 18 – Leo Goeke, US operatic tenor, 74
September 22 – Grigory Frid, 97, Russian composer
September 30 – , 99, German baritone
October 9 
Luna Alcalay, Austrian pianist, music educator and composer, 83
Federico A. Cordero, Puerto Rican classical guitarist, 84
October 12 – Geraldine Mucha, Scottish composer, 95
October 15 – Axel Borup-Jørgensen, Danish composer, 87
October 20 – Przemysław Gintrowski, Polish composer and musician, 60
October 27 – Hans Werner Henze, 86, German composer
November 5 
Bernard Bierman, US composer, 104
Elliott Carter, US composer, 103
November 18 – Sir Philip Ledger, British composer and academic, 74
December 4 
Jonathan Harvey, English composer, 73 (motor neurone disease)
Peter Kiesewetter, German composer, 67
December 5 – Dave Brubeck, American pianist and composer, 91
December 10 – Lisa Della Casa, 93, Swiss soprano
December 11 
Toni Blankenheim, German opera singer, 90
Ravi Shankar, Indian sitar player and composer, 92 
Galina Vishnevskaya, Russian soprano opera singer and recitalist, 86
December 13 – Otto Ketting, Dutch composer, 77
December 20 – Victor Merzhanov, Russian classical pianist, 93
December 24 – Richard Rodney Bennett, 76, British composer

Major awards

Classical Brits
Special Recognition Award — Classic FM (UK)
Female Artist of the Year — Nicola Benedetti
Male Artist of the Year  — Vasily Petrenko
Composer of the Year — John Williams
Critics Award — Benjamin Grosvenor

Grammy Awards
See 54th Grammy Awards

See also
 2012 in opera

References

Clssical
Classical music by year